Pappakurichi is a census town in Tiruchirappalli district in the Indian state of Tamil Nadu. It was merged with the Tiruchirappalli Corporation in 2011.

Demographics
 India census, Pappakurichi had a population of 20,439. Males constitute 50% of the population and females 50%. Pappakurichi has an average literacy rate of 78%, higher than the national average of 59.5%: male literacy is 82%, and female literacy is 73%. In Pappakurichi, 10% of the population is under 6 years of age.

References

Cities and towns in Tiruchirappalli district